David Downing (born 1946) is a British author of mystery novels and nonfiction. His works have been reviewed by Publishers Weekly, The New York Times, and The Wall Street Journal. He is known for his convincing depictions of World War II and Berlin. He has written a series of espionage thrillers, based around Anglo-American character John Russell exploring Germany in the 1940s. They are known as "The Station Series" because they are all named after train stations, mostly in Berlin.

Life

Downing grew up in Harrow, London. He gained a BA in Afro-Asian Studies and an MA in International Relations from the University of Sussex. In 1974 he travelled overland to India via Iran and Afghanistan. He visited the Soviet Union three times. In the late 1980s and early 1990s he was involved in the creation of an environmental centre in north-east London, and visited South and Central America. From 1993 he lived in Boston, Massachusetts with his future wife Nancy. Since 1998 they have lived in Guildford.

Writing

Between 1973 and 1976, Downing contributed to the music magazine Let It Rock and freelanced for other rock magazines. His first book, Future Rock, was published in 1975. This is a study of utopian and science fiction explorations of the future in music, analysing the work of Bob Dylan, David Bowie, Pink Floyd and others.

Jack of Spies, the first novel in a new series set before, during and after World War I, was published in September 2013.

His contributions to the studies of World War II history have appeared in nonfiction books and thrillers. His studies mainly examine the events that decided "the fate of Germany and Japan" toward the end of the war. He wrote a counterfactual history of the Second World War, The Moscow Option. He wrote An Atlas of Territorial and Border Disputes (1980, New English Library).

Under the name David Monnery he has written novels about the Special Air Service and Special Boat Service.

He has also written books about football, history books for children, and a biography of Neil Young.

Publications

John Russell series
Zoo Station (2007) 
Silesian Station (2008) 
Stettin Station (2009) 
Potsdam Station (2010) 
Lehrter Station (2012) 
Masaryk Station (2013) 
Wedding Station (2021)

Jack McColl series
Jack of Spies (2013) 
One Man's Flag (2015) 
Lenin's Roller Coaster (2017) 
The Dark Clouds Shining (2018)

Other novels
The Moscow Option (1980)

The Red Eagles (1987) 
Diary of a Dead Man on Leave (2019)

As David Monnery

Special Boat Service

Special Air Service
 Gambian Bluff
 Guatemala - Journey into Evil
 For King and Country
 Zulu Four
 Mission to Argentina
 Bosnian Inferno
 Samarkand Hijack
 Colombian Cocaine War
 Days of the Dead

Nonfiction books
Future Rock (1976) 
Clint Eastwood—All-American Anti-Hero (1978, with Gary Herman) 
Jane Fonda—All-American Anti-Heroine (1980, with Gary Herman) 
A Dreamer Of Pictures: Neil Young: The Man And His Music (1994) 
Sealing Their Fate: The Twenty-two Days that Decided World War II, (2009)

References

External links
 Author Profile | SOHO Press

20th-century British novelists
21st-century British novelists
Living people
British male novelists
20th-century British male writers
1946 births
Alumni of the University of Sussex
21st-century British male writers